Samuel Barker may refer to:

 Samuel Barker (Canadian politician) (1839–1915), Canadian parliamentarian and lawyer
 Samuel Barker (MP for Cricklade) (died 1708), British member of Parliament for Cricklade
 Samuel Barker (Hebraist) (1686–1759), English Hebraist